Anna Louise Cox is a British neuroscientist who is a Professor in the University College London Faculty of Brain Sciences. Her research considers evidence-based approaches to reduce work-related stress and remain focussed through the use of digital technology. Cox serves as Vice Dean for Equality, Diversity & Inclusion and as an advisor to the House of Commons Digital, Culture, Media and Sport Committee.

Early life and education 
Cox became interested in science as a child. Her father was a science teacher. Cox studied cognitive science at the University of Hertfordshire. She moved to Queen Mary University of London for her graduate studies, where she focussed on human–computer interaction. Cox returned to the University of Hertfordshire for her doctoral research, where she studied exploratory learning using interactive devices.

Research and career 
In 2004, Cox was appointed to the faculty at the University College London Interaction Centre. In 2016, Cox became network Director of Get A Move On, a programme that looks to engage young people, office workers and older adults with digital technologies that benefit their health. She was promoted to Professor in 2017. Her research considers how people interact with technology, and how these interactions impact their lives.

Cox has investigated e-mails, mindfulness apps and digital games. Early in her career, she demonstrated that playing digital games can serve to dissipate work stress. She has shown that people who receive constant, attention-seeking notifications are more likely to make mistakes or achieve their objectives. She proposed that to mitigate digital addiction and the obsessive compulsion to check social media, people should introduce micro-boundaries, such as removing their smart watches when they get home. Cox studied the etiquette of e-mailing, and how people make decisions to prioritise their responses. She has argued that employers and employees should have discussions about expectations around e-mail usage. Cox created her own Email Charter to help to mitigate the overwhelming number of e-mails people receive in the modern world.

Academic service 
Cox has worked to improve gender equality in the sciences throughout her academic career. She was responsible for the Athena SWAN programme for brain sciences. Under her leadership, Cox achieved several silver level Athena SWAN awards. Cox serves as Vice Dean for Equality, Diversity & Inclusion.

Cox is the Chair of Governors at Sandringham School. In 2019 Cox was appointed a specialist advisor to the House of Commons Digital, Culture, Media and Sport Committee. In this capacity, she advised the government on immersive technologies augmented reality. She also served to inform the government on how technology can become addictive.

Selected publications

References 

British neuroscientists
Year of birth missing (living people)
Living people
Academics of University College London
Alumni of the University of Hertfordshire
Alumni of Queen Mary University of London